The Balanced Particle Freeway is a 1997 Australian TV movie starring Damien Bodie.

External links

Film page at Screen Australia
Film page at Sky

1997 television films
1997 films
Australian television films
Australian adventure films
Australian fantasy films
Films directed by Paul Moloney